The following is a current list of regiments of the French Army.

Infantry Regiments 

1er Régiment d'Infanterie (1st Infantry Regiment), 1ere Brigade Mécanisée (1st Mechanized Brigade) - Sarrebourg
1er Régiment de Tirailleurs (1st Riflemen Regiment), 1ere Brigade Mécanisée (1st Mechanized Brigade) - Epinal
1er Bataillon de Chasseurs (1st "Hunter" Battalion)
16e Bataillon de Chasseurs (16th "Hunter" Battalion), 2e Brigade Blindée (2nd Armoured Brigade) - Bitche
24e Régiment d'Infanterie (24th Infantry Regiment), Commandement des Forces Terrestres (Land Forces Command) - Paris
35e Régiment d'Infanterie (35th Infantry Regiment), 7e Brigade Blindée (7th Armoured Brigade) - Belfort
44e Régiment d'Infanterie (44th Infantry Regiment)
92e Régiment d'Infanterie (92nd Infantry Regiment), 3e Brigade Mécanisée (3rd Mechanized Brigade) - Clermond Ferrand
126e Régiment d'Infanterie (126th Infantry Regiment), 3e Brigade Mécanisée (3rd Mechanized Brigade) - Brive
132e Régiment d'Infanterie (132nd Infantry Regiment)
152e Régiment d'Infantrie (152nd Infantry Regiment), 7e Brigade Blindée (7th Armoured Brigade) - Colmar.

Parachutistes ( Parachute Chasseur ) 

1er Régiment de Chasseurs Parachutistes (1st Airborne "Hunter" Regiment), 11e Brigade Parachutiste (11th Airborne Brigade) - Pamiers

Troupes de Montagne (Mountain Troops) 

7e Bataillon de Chasseurs Alpins (7th Alpine "Hunter" Battalion), 27e Brigade d'Infanterie de Montagne (27th Mountain Infantry Brigade) - Bourg St. Maurice
13e Bataillon de Chasseurs Alpins (13th Alpine "Hunter" Battalion), 27e Brigade d'Infanterie de Montagne (27th Mountain Infantry Brigade) - Barby
27e Bataillon de Chasseurs Alpins (27th Alpine "Hunter" Battalion), 27e Brigade d'Infanterie de Montagne (27th Mountain Infantry Brigade) - Cran Gevrier

Arme Blindée Cavalerie (Armoured Cavalry) 

1er Régiment de Spahis (1st Spahis Regiment), 1ère Brigade Mécanisée (1st Mechanized Brigade) - Valence (26)
1er Régiment de Chasseurs d'Afrique (1st African "Hunter" Regiment), Unité d'entrainement et de formation (Training Unit) - Canjuers
1er Régiment de Chasseurs (1st "Hunter" Regiment), 7e Brigade Blindée (7th Armoured Brigade) - Thierville sur Meuse
4e Régiment de Chasseurs (4th "Hunter" Regiment), 27e Brigade d'Infanterie de Montagne (27th Mountain Infantry Brigade) - Gap
2e Régiment de Dragons NBC (2nd NBC Dragoons Regiment), Commandement des Forces Terrestres (Land Forces Command) - Fontevraud
5e Régiment de Dragons, (5th Dragoon Regiment) 7e Brigade Blindée (7th Armoured Brigade) - Mailly-le-Camp
1 Régiment de Hussards Parachutistes (1st Parachute Hussars Regiment) 11e Brigade Parachutiste- Tarbes
2e Régiment de Hussards (2nd Hussars Regiment), Brigade de Renseignement (Intelligence Brigade) - Haguenau
3e Régiment de Hussards (3rd Hussars Regiment), Brigade Franco-Allemande (Joint French-German Brigade) - Metz
5e Régiment de Cuirassiers (5th Cuirassier Regiment) - United Arab Emirates
12e Régiment de Cuirassiers (12th Cuirassier Regiment), 2e Brigade Blindée (2nd Armoured Brigade) - Olivet
501e Régiment de chars de combat (501st Tank Regiment), 2e Brigade Blindée (2nd Armoured Brigade) - Mourmelon

Artillerie (Artillery) 
1er Régiment d'Artillerie (1st Artillery Regiment), 7e Brigade Blindée (7th Armoured Brigade) - Belfort
8e Régiment d'Artillerie (8th Artillery Regiment), 7e Brigade Blindée (7th Armoured Brigade) - Commercy
17e Groupe d'Artillerie (17th Artillery Battalion), Unité d'entrainement et de formation (Training Unit) - Biscarrosse
28e Groupe Géographique (28th "Mapping" Battalion), Brigade de Renseignement (Intelligence Brigade) - Oberhoffen-sur-Moder
40e Régiment d'Artillerie (40th Artillery Regiment), 2ème Brigade Blindée (2nd Armoured Brigade) - Suippes
54e Régiment d'Artillerie (54th Artillery Regiment), 7e Brigade Blindée (7th Armoured Brigade) - Hyers
61e Régiment d'Artillerie (61st Artillery Regiment), Brigade de Renseignement (Intelligence Brigade) - Chaumont
68e Régiment d'Artillerie d'Afrique (68th African Artillery Regiment), 3e Brigade Mécanisée (3rd Mechanized Brigade) - La Valbonne

Artillerie Parachutistes ( Parachute Artillery ) 

35e Régiment d'Artillerie Parachutiste (35th Airborne Artillery Regiment), 11e Brigade Parachutiste (11th Airborne Brigade) - Tarbes

Troupes de Montagne (Mountain Troops) 
93e Régiment d'Artillerie de Montagne (93rd Mountain Artillery Regiment), 27e Brigade d'Infanterie de Montagne (27th Mountain Infantry Brigade) - Varces

Génie (Engineers) 
3e Régiment du Génie (3rd Engineer Regiment), 1ere Brigade Mécanisée (1st Mechanized Brigade) - Charleville
5e Régiment du Génie (5th Engineer Regiment)
6e Régiment du Génie (6th Engineer Regiment), 9e Brigade Légère Blindée de Marine (9th Light Armoured Marine Brigade) - Angers
13e Régiment du Génie (13th Engineer Regiment), 2e Brigade Blindée (2nd Armoured Brigade) - Le Valdahon
19e Régiment du Génie (19th Engineer Regiment), 7e Brigade Blindée (7th Armoured Brigade) - Besançon
31e Régiment du Génie (31st Engineer Regiment), 3e Brigade Mécanisée (3rd Mechanized Brigade) - Castelsarrasin

Génie Parachutistes ( Parachute Engineer ) 

17e Régiment du Génie Parachutiste (17th Engineer Airborne Regiment), 11e Brigade Parachutiste (11th Airborne Brigade) - Montauban
25e Régiment du Génie de l'Air (25th Air Engineer Regiment) - Istres

Aviation Légère de l'Armée de Terre (ALAT) ( Land Force Light Aviation ) 

1er Régiment d'Hélicoptères de Combat (1st Combat Helicopter Regiment), Commandement des Forces Terrestres (Land Forces Command) - Phalsbourg
3e Régiment d'Hélicoptères de Combat (3rd Combat Helicopter Regiment), Commandement des Forces Terrestres (Land Forces Command) - Étain
5e Régiment d'Hélicoptères de Combat (5th Combat Helicopter Regiment), Commandement des Forces Terrestres (Land Forces Command) - Pau
4e Régiment d'Hélicoptères des Forces Spéciales (4th Special Forces Helicopter Regiment), Brigade des Forces Spéciales (Special Forces Brigade) - Pau

Transmissions (Signals) 
28e Régiment de Transmissions (28th Signal Regiment), Brigade de Transmissions (Signal Brigade) - Issoire
40e Régiment de Transmissions (40th Signal Regiment), Brigade de Transmissions (Signal Brigade) - Thionville
41e Régiment de Transmissions (41st Signal Regiment) - Douai
44e Régiment de Transmissions (44th Signal Regiment), Brigade de Renseignement (Intelligence Brigade) - Mutzig
48e Régiment de Transmissions (48th Signal Regiment), Brigade de Transmissions (Signal Brigade) - Agen
53e Régiment de Transmissions (53rd Signal Regiment), Brigade de Transmissions (Signal Brigade) - Lunéville
54e Régiment de Transmissions (54th Signal Regiment), Brigade de Renseignement (Intelligence Brigade) - Haguenau
785e compagnie de guerre électronique (785th Electronic Warfare Company) - Orléans

Train (Transportation) 

121e Régiment du Train (121st Transportation Regiment), 1ere brigade logistique (1st Logistics Brigade) - Linas-Montlhery
503e Régiment du Train (503rd Transportation Regiment), 1ere brigade logistique (1st Logistics Brigade) - Nîmes
511e Régiment du Train (511th Transportation Regiment), 1ere brigade logistique (1st Logistics Brigade) - Auxonne
515e Régiment du Train (515th Transportation Regiment), 1ere brigade logistique (1st Logistics Brigade) - Brie
516e Régiment du Train (516th Transportation Regiment), 1ere brigade logistique (1st Logistics Brigade) - Toul
519e Groupe de Transit Maritime - Toulon

Parachutistes Train ( Parachute Train ) 

1er Régiment du Train Parachutiste (1st Airborne Transportation Regiment), 11e Brigade Parachutiste (11th Airborne Brigade) - Toulouse

Matériel (Quartermaster) 
2e Régiment du Matériel (2nd Quartermaster Regiment), Service de maintenance industrielle terrestre - Bruz
3e Régiment du Matériel (3rd Quartermaster Regiment), Service de maintenance industrielle terrestre - Muret
4e Régiment du Matériel (4th Quartermaster Regiment), Service de maintenance industrielle terrestre - Nîmes
6e Régiment du Matériel (6th Quartermaster Regiment), Service de maintenance industrielle terrestre - Besançon
7e Régiment du Matériel (7th Quartermaster Regiment), Service de maintenance industrielle terrestre - Lyon
8e Régiment du Matériel (8th Quartermaster Regiment), Service de maintenance industrielle terrestre - Mourmelon

Other 
Régiment de soutien opérationnel (Operational Support Regiment - Administrative) - Toulouse
Régiment Médical (Medical Regiment), 1re brigade logistique (1st Logistics Brigade) - La Valbonne

Troupes de Marine (Marine Troops)

Infanterie (Infantry)
2e Régiment d'Infanterie de Marine (2nd Marine Infantry Regiment), 9e Brigade Légère Blindée de Marine (9th Light Armoured Marine Brigade) - Le Mans
3e Régiment d'Infanterie de Marine (3rd Marine Infantry Regiment), 9e Brigade Légère Blindée de Marine (9th Light Armoured Marine Brigade) - Vannes
6e Bataillon d'Infanterie de Marine (6th Marine Infantry Battalion), Unités en Pays Africain (Units in Africa) - Libreville (Gabon)
9e Régiment d'Infanterie de Marine (9th Marine Infantry Regiment), Unités des départements et territoires d'Outre Mer Français (Units in French overseas departments and territories) - Cayenne (French Guiana)
21e Régiment d'Infanterie de Marine (21st Marine Infantry Regiment), 6e Brigade Légère Blindée (6th Light Armoured Brigade) - Fréjus
Régiment de Marche du Tchad (Marching Regiment of Chad), 2e Brigade Blindée (2nd Armoured Brigade) - Meyenheim
Régiment d'Infanterie de Marine du Pacifique-Nouvelle Calédonie (Marine Infantry Regiment of the Pacific-New Caledonia), Unités des départements et territoires d'Outre Mer Français (Units in French overseas departments and territories) - Nouméa

Parachutistes d'Infanterie de Marine ( Marine Infantry Parachute )

1er Régiment de Parachutistes d'Infanterie de Marine (1st Marine Airborne Infantry Regiment), Brigade des Forces Spéciales (Special Forces Brigade) - Bayonne
2e Régiment de Parachutistes d'Infanterie de Marine (2nd Marine Airborne Infantry Regiment), Unités des départements et territoires d'Outre Mer Français (Units in French overseas departments and territories) - Réunion
3e Régiment de Parachutistes d'Infanterie de Marine, (3rd Marine Airborne Infantry Regiment), 11e Brigade Parachutiste (11th Airborne Brigade) - Carcassonne
8e Régiment de Parachutistes d'Infanterie de Marine, (8th Marine Airborne Infantry Regiment), 11e Brigade Parachutiste (11th Airborne Brigade) - Castres

Unités Blindées (Armoured Units)
Note: These units are technically part of the infantry but operate and use equipment similar to the Arme Blindée Cavalerie (Armoured Cavalry). Like the US Marine Corps, the Troupes de Marine do not use the definition "Cavalry".
1er Régiment d'Infanterie de Marine (1st Marine Infantry Regiment), 3e Brigade mécanisée (3rd Mechanised Brigade') - Angoulême
Régiment d'infanterie-chars de marine (Marine Infantry-Tank Regiment), 9e Brigade Légère Blindée de Marine (9th Light Armoured Marine Brigade) - Poitiers

Artillerie (Artillery)
3e Régiment d'Artilerie de Marine (3rd Marine Artillery Regiment), 6e Brigade Légère Blindée (6th Light Armoured Brigade) - Canjuers
11e Régiment d'Artilerie de Marine (11th Marine Artillery Regiment), 9e Brigade Légère Blindée de Marine (9th Light Armoured Marine Brigade) - St. Aubin du Cormier

Interarmes
Note: This unit combines infantry company, light cavalry squadron and artillery battery within the same regiment.
5e Régiment Interarmes Outre Mer Unités en Pays Africain (Units in Africa) - Djibouti

Légion Etrangère (Foreign Legion)

Infanterie (Infantry)
1er Régiment Etranger (1st Foreign Regiment), Aubagne, France, (Recruiting Regiment, COM.LE - Commandment of the Foreign Legion, Transfer Regiment for incoming and outgoing soldiers from/to other Regiments, Secret Service of the FFL, Administration of the FFL).
2e Régiment Etranger d'Infanterie (2nd Foreign Infantry Regiment), 6e Brigade Légère Blindée (6th Light Armoured Brigade) - Nîmes.
3e Régiment Etranger d'Infanterie (3rd Foreign Infantry Regiment), Unités des départements et territoires d'Outre Mer Français (Units in French overseas departments and territories) - Kourou (French Guiana).
4ème Régiment Etranger (4th Foreign Regiment), Castelnaudary, France, (Education regiment)
13e Demi-Brigade de la Légion Etrangère (13th Demi-Brigade of the Foreign Legion), Camp du Larzac.
Détachement de la Légion Etrangère à Mayotte (Foreign Legion Detachment in Mayotte), Unités des départements et territoires d'Outre Mer Français (Units in French overseas departments and territories) - Mayotte, Comore Islands.

Parachutistes (Airborne)

2e Régiment Etranger Parachutiste (2nd Foreign Parachute Regiment), 11e Brigade Parachutiste (11th Airborne Brigade) - Calvi, Corse (Corsica Island).

Cavalerie Blindée (Armoured Cavalry)
1er Régiment Etranger de Cavalerie (1st Foreign Cavalry Regiment), 6e Brigade Légère Blindée (6th Light Armoured Brigade) - Orange

Génie Combat (Combat Engineers)

1e Régiment Etranger du Génie (1st Foreign Engineer Regiment), 6e Brigade Légère Blindée (6th Light Armoured Brigade) - Laudun.
DINOPS Teams 
2e Régiment Etranger du Génie (2nd Foreign Engineer Regiment), 27e Brigade d'Infanterie de Montagne (27th Mountain Infantry Brigade) - Saint-Christol.
DINOPS Teams
Mountain Commando Groups ( GCM )

Franco-Allemande ( Franco-German Brigade )
 1erBrigade Franco-allemande ( Franco-German Brigade )

Notes
Year founded:
1635 1st Cuirassier Regiment (France) carried on by the 1st Cuirassier Squadrons Group of the 1st-11th Cuirassier Regiment.
1635 6th Cuirassier Regiment (France) carried on by merged with the 12th Cuirassier Regiment to form the 6th-12th Cuirassier Regiment
1645 3rd Cuirassier Regiment (France) carried on by the 2nd Squadron of the 5th Cuirassier Regiment and the E.E.D. of the 57th D.B.
1676 13th Parachute Dragoon Regiment founded as a Dragoon Regiment
1684 Saintonge Regiment carried on by the 82éme Regiment of Infantry.
1688 12th Cuirassier Regiment (France) carried on by the 6th Cuirassier Regiment to form the 6th-12th Cuirassier Regiment.
1690 Royal Suédois regiment flag and traditions carried on by company in the French Army's 4th Infantry Regiment.
1720 1st Parachute Hussar Regiment

Regiments of France
Army regiments